The Slovakia national under-17 football team has represented Slovakia at the FIFA U-17 World Cup on one occasion, in 2013.

FIFA U-17 World Cup record

Record by opponent

2013 FIFA U-17 World Cup

Group A

Goalscorers

References

FIFA U-17 World Cup